is a Japanese character designer and illustrator. She is well known as the third character designer of Hello Kitty.

Biography

Early life
Yamaguchi was born in Kōchi, Kōchi, Japan. She attended Joshibi University of Art and Design where she studied industrial design.

Sanrio tenure
Yamaguchi joined Sanrio in 1978. In 1980, Yamaguchi won an internal design contest with her design of Hello Kitty playing the piano, and would later become the third (and current) primary designer of Hello Kitty.

Aside from Hello Kitty, Yamaguchi has been designing Jewelpet since 2008. She also did the illustration for TV Asahi's official mascot, Go-Chan.

References

External links
Official blog 

Japanese graphic designers
People from Kōchi, Kōchi
Living people
Hello Kitty
Jewelpet
1955 births
Artists from Kōchi Prefecture
Joshibi University of Art and Design alumni